Alexander Clas Robin Gerndt (born 14 July 1986) is a Swedish professional footballer who plays as a striker.

Club career

AIK
Born and raised in Visby, on the island of Gotland, Gerndt started to play for the island's top club Visby IF Gute during his youth system. As Gute's second best goal-scorer, he drew attention from Swedish top league clubs such as Örebro SK and AIK. On 3 November 2006, he signed a three-year contract with AIK.
In 2007, he only made five appearances in the league, all without scoring. Struggling to make it into the starting 11, he was loaned out to the second tier club Sirius prior to the 2008 season. In Sirius, he made 14 appearances, scoring six goals.

Gefle
Although it was thought that he would stay the entire season on loan at Sirius, he signed for Gefle in the top flight division during the summer transfer window of 2008.
His start in Gefle was not a success at all; he did not score any goals for the club during 2008.
In the season of 2009, Gerndt played 26 out of 30 league games (14 as a starter), scoring 3 goals.

In 2010, he made a major breakthrough in his career. Showing much improvement, he scored 8 goals in the first 14 games for Gefle. As a fact of that, it was rumored that he would make a transfer to the Dutch team Heerenveen in the summer transfer windows of 2010, but also that Helsingborg wanted his signature.

Helsingborg
On 18 July 2010, it was confirmed that he would move to Helsingborg, signing a 3.5 year contract. Helsingborg were during that time a club fighting to be the Swedish champions of 2010.
Gerndt continued to score goals and was a major reason that Helsingborg could battle against their biggest rivals Malmö for the title into the last round of the league. In 15 games, he scored 12 goals and was the top-scorer of Allsvenskan in 2010 with a total of 20 goals. Alexander Gerndt was also named the Player of the Year in the 2010 Allsvenskan. He received the price at a gala in Malmö, the city of Helsingborg's rivals, and was greeted by whistles from the crowd. Alexander Gerndt, however, took his time and waited them out to have utter silence when holding his winning speech.

Utrecht
Helsingborgs IF, aware there was a big risk that Alexander Gerndt would leave the club, started to look for replacements already in March 2011. Alexander Gerndt was for a while rumored to sign with the Danish club Copenhagen, and on 30 June he confirmed his interest in accepting a 20-million SEK deal with the club. However, on 12 July it was announced that no deal with F.C. Copenhagen would be made.

The same day as that announcement, the Dutch club Utrecht offered Alexander Gerndt a 35-million SEK deal. On 18 July 2011, exactly a year after signing with Helsingborgs IF, Alexander Gerndt signed a four-year contract worth roughly 27 million SEK and joined the club playing in the Eredivisie, the top football league in the Netherlands, on 1 August. The affair was the biggest in Helsingborgs IF's club history.

Alexander Gerndt's first game with FC Utrecht did not come in the team's premiere game of the season on 6 August 2011; the Swedish Discipline Committee suspended Alexander Gerndt between 5–7 August as a result of an incident on 23 July when he punched Malmö player Miljan Mutavdžić in the head, and the suspension was carried over to FC Utrecht as the Dutch Football Association (DFA) was notified by the Swedish Football Association (SFA) of the suspension. Instead, his debut game with FC Utrecht came on 14 August 2011, at home against De Graafschap. The game ended in a 2–2 tie. Alexander Gerndt had a great chance to score the game-winning goal in the second half, but the shot hit the inside post. Gerndt's first goal with Utrecht came instead on 19 September 2011, in a match against Heracles Almelo that finished in another 2–2 tie.

Young Boys
On 31 January 2013, the last day of the 2012–13 transfer window, it was confirmed that Gerndt had joined Swiss Super League club Young Boys.

Lugano
Gerndt moved to FC Lugano, also of the Swiss Super League, in August 2017. He signed a contract until 2019. He played his first game just three days after being transferred to Lugano.

Thun
On 3 July 2021, he signed a contract with Thun in the second-tier Swiss Challenge League for the term of one year with an option for a second year.

International career 
Alexander Gerndt scored his first goal for the Sweden national team against Botswana, scoring the 1–0 goal in a game that ended with a 2–1 win for the Swedish team.

Personal life
Gerndt has gone through a divorce with his wife My, and they have two children together. Gerndt is very popular among fans of his former teams in Helsingborg as well as Gävle. He has talked about his big interest of tattoos and he has said it's like an obsession. "Once you’ve started, you can’t stop; you are always looking for what the next tattoo project can be." Gerndt was also a survivor of the 2004 Indian Ocean earthquake and tsunami.

Sentence 
In December 2011, Gerndt was handed a suspended jail sentence and fined 80,000 SEK for assaulting his ex-wife My. This handed him an indefinite ban from the Swedish national team, as decided by the Swedish Football Association (SvFF). However, the suspension from the national team was lifted on 27 April 2012. Both Gerndt and the prosecutor of the case decided to appeal the sentence on 3 January 2012. Gerndt considered himself not guilty while the prosecutor originally was appealing for a three-month jail sentence.

Career statistics

International 

Scores and results list Sweden's goal tally first, score column indicates score after each Gerndt goal.

Honours
Helsingborg

 Allsvenskan: 2011
Individual
 Allsvenskan top scorer: 2010 (20 goals)
 Allsvenskan Player of the Year: 2010

References

External links
Gefle IF profile

1986 births
Living people
Sportspeople from Gotland County
Swedish footballers
Swedish expatriate footballers
Association football midfielders
Association football forwards
AIK Fotboll players
Helsingborgs IF players
Gefle IF players
IK Sirius Fotboll players
Allsvenskan players
Superettan players
FC Utrecht players
Eredivisie players
FC Lugano players
BSC Young Boys players
FC Thun players
Swiss Super League players
Swiss Challenge League players
Expatriate footballers in the Netherlands
Expatriate footballers in Switzerland
Swedish expatriate sportspeople in the Netherlands
Swedish expatriate sportspeople in Switzerland
People convicted of assault
Sweden international footballers